Transportation Journal is an academic journal devoted to transportation, logistics and related fields. The journal is published quarterly by the Penn State University Press on behalf of the American Society of Transportation and Logistics.

External links 
Official website
American Society of Transportation and Logistics

English-language journals
Penn State University Press academic journals
Publications established in 1961
Quarterly journals
Business and management journals
Transportation journals